The Shchyolkovo constituency (No.127) is a Russian legislative constituency in Moscow Oblast. The constituency covers northeastern suburbs and exurbs of Moscow. The constituency was initially created in 1993, but was eliminated in 1995 and its territory was partitioned between Noginsk and Pushkino constituencies. Shchyolkovo constituency was reinstated in 2015 mostly from the territory of Noginsk constituency.

Members elected

Election results

1993

|-
! colspan=2 style="background-color:#E9E9E9;text-align:left;vertical-align:top;" |Candidate
! style="background-color:#E9E9E9;text-align:left;vertical-align:top;" |Party
! style="background-color:#E9E9E9;text-align:right;" |Votes
! style="background-color:#E9E9E9;text-align:right;" |%
|-
|style="background-color:"|
|align=left|Vladimir Zhirinovsky
|align=left|Liberal Democratic Party
|
|34.51%
|-
|style="background-color:"|
|align=left|Nikolay Pashin
|align=left|Independent
| -
|12.90%
|-
| colspan="5" style="background-color:#E9E9E9;"|
|- style="font-weight:bold"
| colspan="3" style="text-align:left;" | Total
| 
| 100%
|-
| colspan="5" style="background-color:#E9E9E9;"|
|- style="font-weight:bold"
| colspan="4" |Source:
|
|}

2016

|-
! colspan=2 style="background-color:#E9E9E9;text-align:left;vertical-align:top;" |Candidate
! style="background-color:#E9E9E9;text-align:left;vertical-align:top;" |Party
! style="background-color:#E9E9E9;text-align:right;" |Votes
! style="background-color:#E9E9E9;text-align:right;" |%
|-
|style="background-color:"|
|align=left|Sergey Zhigarev
|align=left|Liberal Democratic Party
|
|33.43%
|-
|style="background-color:"|
|align=left|Natalya Yeremeytseva
|align=left|Communist Party
|
|23.24%
|-
|style="background-color:"|
|align=left|Oleg Volkov
|align=left|A Just Russia
|
|11.06%
|-
|style="background-color:"|
|align=left|Irina Kukushkina
|align=left|Yabloko
|
|5.22%
|-
|style="background:"| 
|align=left|Lyubov Filipp
|align=left|Party of Growth
|
|4.59%
|-
|style="background:"| 
|align=left|Oleg Shirokov
|align=left|Patriots of Russia
|
|4.44%
|-
|style="background:"| 
|align=left|Pavel Seliverstov
|align=left|Communists of Russia
|
|4.14%
|-
|style="background-color:"|
|align=left|Georgy Goryachevsky
|align=left|Rodina
|
|3.52%
|-
|style="background-color:"|
|align=left|Nikolay Garankin
|align=left|The Greens
|
|3.38%
|-
| colspan="5" style="background-color:#E9E9E9;"|
|- style="font-weight:bold"
| colspan="3" style="text-align:left;" | Total
| 
| 100%
|-
| colspan="5" style="background-color:#E9E9E9;"|
|- style="font-weight:bold"
| colspan="4" |Source:
|
|}

2021

|-
! colspan=2 style="background-color:#E9E9E9;text-align:left;vertical-align:top;" |Candidate
! style="background-color:#E9E9E9;text-align:left;vertical-align:top;" |Party
! style="background-color:#E9E9E9;text-align:right;" |Votes
! style="background-color:#E9E9E9;text-align:right;" |%
|-
|style="background-color:"|
|align=left|Aleksandr Tolmachyov
|align=left|United Russia
|
|38.30%
|-
|style="background-color:"|
|align=left|Yelena Mokrinskaya
|align=left|Communist Party
|
|23.57%
|-
|style="background-color:"|
|align=left|Oleg Shirokov
|align=left|A Just Russia — For Truth
|
|6.61%
|-
|style="background-color:"|
|align=left|Igor Konstantinov
|align=left|Liberal Democratic Party
|
|6.53%
|-
|style="background-color: "|
|align=left|Tatyana Zykova
|align=left|Party of Pensioners
|
|6.21%
|-
|style="background-color: " |
|align=left|Yegor Timofeyev
|align=left|New People
|
|5.33%
|-
|style="background-color:"|
|align=left|Artyom Kovalev
|align=left|The Greens
|
|3.46%
|-
|style="background: "| 
|align=left|Irina Kukushkina
|align=left|Yabloko
|
|2.78%
|-
|style="background:"| 
|align=left|Viktor Zvagelsky
|align=left|Party of Growth
|
|1.64%
|-
| colspan="5" style="background-color:#E9E9E9;"|
|- style="font-weight:bold"
| colspan="3" style="text-align:left;" | Total
| 
| 100%
|-
| colspan="5" style="background-color:#E9E9E9;"|
|- style="font-weight:bold"
| colspan="4" |Source:
|
|}

Notes

References

Russian legislative constituencies
Politics of Moscow Oblast